Michael Sukin is an American attorney specializing in music and entertainment, the owner of Sukin Law Group. Sukin was a founder of the International Association of Entertainment Lawyers. Nashville Post called him an "internationally recognized entertainment attorney".
Association of Independent Music Publishers refer to Sukin as a "music publishing and copyright expert".
According to the aforemention AIMP reference, Michael Sukin has been instrumental to music copyright legislation in the European Union. In this role he worked extensively with the European Commission, as well as the International Music Publishers Association.

Career 
Michael Sukin was raised in a music publishing family and has worked in music publishing, the record industry and musical theater ever since. He is considered a leading expert in his field.

Chambers U.S.A. (the leading rating reference for attorneys) refers to Mr. Sukin as a "gifted lawyer of rare experience in music issues" and states that: "representing estates, bands and artists, he is 'a lawyer who understands the music industry backwards, inside out and upside down.'"  Chambers has consistently ranked Michael Sukin amongst the top attorneys in media entertainment in New York.

Mr. Sukin's clients have included the Estate of Elvis Presley, CKX, Inc., The George Gershwin Family Trust, the Rolling Stones, the Clash, Leiber and Stoller, the Interests of Jule Styne, Adoph Green and Betty Comden, the creators of Les Misérables, Charles Aznavour and numerous artists, writers, music publishers, record companies and entertainment industry investors throughout the world.

He has worked on music business, copyright and legislative issues in North America, Europe, Japan and Latin America. He served as Director of Business Affairs under Clive Davis at CBS Records, has produced records, films and managed recording artists. Mr. Sukin has been a key player in the acquisition and sale of major music entities. Mr. Sukin's firm has offices in New York and Nashville, and the firm has engaged in matters in various languages.

Michael Sukin has acted on music related legislation in the European Union for over a dozen years, as such he has met and worked extensively with European publishers and collecting societies in both Eastern and Western Europe.

Mr. Sukin holds a certificate from the Institut d'Études Politiques, is a magna cum laude graduate of Cornell University and the Stanford University Law School. He is fluent in the French language.

Mr. Sukin was awarded the President's medal from the Country Music Association and is a founding Director of the International Association of Entertainment Lawyers, which has grown to an extensive membership in numerous countries throughout the world. Mr. Sukin has written and lectured extensively on issues within his expertise in the United States and Europe. He has appeared as an expert on news commentary shows including the BBC World and has been quoted in numerous periodicals including The Financial Times, The Wall Street Journal, Variety, Billboard, Music Week.

After a long working relationship, Sukin Law Group recently announced their affiliation with Cowan, Liebowitz & Latman, P.C., a New York City firm which is recognized as a worldwide leader in intellectual property law and related litigation and business transactions.

References

External links 
 

American lawyers
Members of the Country Music Association
Year of birth missing (living people)
Living people